In enzymology, a xyloglucan-specific endo-beta-1,4-glucanase is an enzyme that catalyzes the chemical reaction

xyloglucan + H2O  xyloglucan oligosaccharides

Thus, the two substrates of this enzyme are xyloglucan and H2O, whereas its product is xyloglucan oligosaccharides.

This enzyme belongs to the family of hydrolases, specifically those glycosidases that hydrolyse O- and S-glycosyl compounds.  The systematic name of this enzyme class is [(1->6)-alpha-D-xylo]-(1->4)-beta-D-glucan glucanohydrolase. Other names in common use include XEG, xyloglucan endo-beta-1,4-glucanase, xyloglucanase, xyloglucanendohydrolase, XH, and 1,4-beta-D-glucan glucanohydrolase.

Family 12 was first identified in plant pathogens by discovery in Phytophthora spp.

Structural studies

References

Further reading 

 
 
 

EC 3.2.1
Enzymes of known structure